Marilyn Burns may refer to:

Marilyn Burns (1949–2014), American actress
Marilyn Burns (mathematics educator) (born 1941), American mathematics educator and children's mathematics book author
Marilyn Burns (politician) (born c. 1956), Canadian politician and leader of the Alberta Advantage Party